Shaydon (Russian and Tajik: Шайдон, formerly Asht (Russian and Tajik: Ашт)) is a town and a jamoat in north-west Tajikistan. It is the seat of Asht District in Sughd Region. The town proper has a population of 18,200 (2020). The jamoat consists of the town Shaydon and the villages Dahana, Kulikhoja and Mullomir.

References

Populated places in Sughd Region
Jamoats of Tajikistan